Home Mission Society may refer to:

 American Home Mission Society, a historic Protestant Christian missionary society founded in 1826
 American Baptist Home Mission Society, a Christian missionary society established in 1832
 Catholic Home Missions, an organization to support poor dioceses in the United States
 Free Will Baptist Home Missions, the North American sending agency for the National Association of Free Will Baptists
 Glenmary Home Missioners, a Roman Catholic religious institute working in the rural United States
 Laymen's Home Missionary Movement, an American non-sectarian, interdenominational religious organisation
 Ramakrishna Mission Home of Service, an Indian branch of Ramakrishna Mission
 Women's Home Missionary Society, formed in 1893 in San Francisco, California

See also
 List of Protestant missionary societies (1691–1900)
 Missionary (disambiguation)
 Mission (disambiguation)